Mohamed Whale Kamara (born ) is a Sierra Leonean male weightlifter, competing in the 85 kg category and representing Sierra Leone at international competitions. He participated at the 2010 Commonwealth Games in the 85 kg event.

Major competitions

References

1987 births
Living people
Sierra Leonean male weightlifters
Weightlifters at the 2010 Commonwealth Games
Commonwealth Games competitors for Sierra Leone
Place of birth missing (living people)